The Birmingham School was a school of economic thought that emerged in Birmingham, England during the post-Napoleonic depression that affected England following the end of the Napoleonic wars in 1815.

Overview
Arguing an underconsumptionist theory – attributing the depression to the fall in demand due to the end of the wars and end of war mobilization – Birmingham School economists opposed the gold standard and advocated the use of an expansionary monetary policy to achieve full employment.

The leading thinker and spokesman for the Birmingham School was the banker Thomas Attwood. Other notable figures included George Frederick Muntz and Thomas Attwood's brother Matthias Attwood. Economists who lent the Birmingham School some support included Arthur Young, Patrick Colquhoun and Sir John Sinclair.

Dismissed at the time as "currency cranks" or "crude inflationists", the theories of the Birmingham School are now recognized as embryonic versions of the Keynesian economics of the 1930s. Some of Attwood's writings contain formulations of the multiplier effect and an income-expenditure model. In his 1954 History of Economic Analysis, Joseph Schumpeter wrote that "it is from these writings that any study of modern ideas on monetary management ought to start".

See also
 Manchester School, the other contemporary school associated with British industrial capitalism
 Peel's Bill

References

Bibliography

 Miller, Henry. "Radicals, Tories or Monomaniacs? The Birmingham Currency Reformers in the House of Commons, 1832-67," Parliamentary History (2012) 31#3 pp 354–377.

Schools of economic thought
Keynesian economics
History of Birmingham, West Midlands
Full employment